Zaoqiao is a railway station on the Taiwan Railways Administration Taichung line located in Zaoqiao Township, Miaoli County, Taiwan.

History
The station was opened on 7 October 1903.

See also
 List of railway stations in Taiwan

References

External links

1903 establishments in Taiwan
Railway stations in Miaoli County
Railway stations opened in 1903
Railway stations served by Taiwan Railways Administration